Ivan Stanev (born 29 June 1959) is an author, theatre and film director, scenographer and new media artist, who has been living in Berlin since 1988, and more recently in Paris.

Biography
Ivan Stanev was born in the city of Varna, Bulgaria. His mother, Donka Raikova, was a lawyer and poet and his father, Stanju Stanev, was an engineer and photographer. He enrolled into a German-language high school, while also studying intensively French, Russian and English.

He got his degree in Theatre Directing from the National Academy for Theatre and Film Arts in Sofia. While a student in the academy, he founded a clandestine avant-garde theatre group, which led to severe conflicts with censorship in Communist Bulgaria. Not allowed to work as a theatre director anymore, he went on to study philosophy at the Sofia University, and started to translate the works of Theodor Adorno and Heiner Muller, in the meantime writing plays, poems and essays, all to be published much later.

In 1988, he was invited to present his theatre production called The Wound Woyzeck at a theatre festival in West-Berlin. He decided not to return to Bulgaria and to live in exile instead. He began to write in German and to stage his own plays in Berlin.

Since 1999, he has also worked on several major Franco-German theatre productions. Due to his growing interest in visual arts, he directed and produced two experimental films: Villa Dei Misteri and Luxor Las Vegas. In 2009 he finished his first independent feature film, shot on 35 mm, called Moon Lake, produced by Donka Angelova.

He currently lives in Berlin and Paris and works in both Germany and France.

Writings 
In Bulgarian
 The Exterminated Denizens  (excerpts from the sketchbooks of a démodé modernist) - poetry, drama, theory: 1985-1987. Publishing house "Virga", Sofia 1994,
In German
1992 Lapsus Linguae, Autoren-Kollegium Berlin
2000 Postskriptum, a poem, Juliettes Literatursalon Berlin
2002 Villa Dei Misteri, Juliettes Literatursalon Berlin
2003 Luxor Las Vegas, Konkursbuch Verlag Berlin/Tübingen
2009 Moon Lake, a poem, Publishing house Altera
2017 Abrasax Asteroiden, a poem, Bleibende Steinzeit/Tumult/Sonderzahl Wien
2018 Place Fantôme, dramatic poem, T.INTE Berlin
In English
2023 Poems in Posthuman Akkadian

Films

Films shot on video
 Villa dei misteri (2003)
 Luxor Las Vegas (2006)
 Le Bleu du Ciel (2016)
 Inge (2019)

Films shot on 35 mm
 Moon Lake (2009)

Web Television
 TTV - Totleben TV (2023)

Installations
 Don Juan im Kumpelnest 3000 zu Berlin (2000)
 Hollywood Forever (2004)
 Place Fantôme (2018)

New Media Art
 CHEZ TOTLEBEN | Phantom Art Apartment (2023)
 GOT | Garden of Totleben (2023)
 TO DESCA | Totleben´s Writing Desk (2023)

Exhibitions
 ANIMA MUNDI - RITUALS | VENICE(2022)
 ANIMA MUNDI - CONSCIOUSNESS | VENICE(2022)
 ROME INTERNATIONAL ART FAIR | MEDINA ART GALLERY | ROME(2022)
 LONDON CONTEMPORARY | THE LINE CONTEMPORARY ART SPACE | LONDON(2022)
 MISS TOTO K. | SEVEN STAR GALLERY | BERLIN(2022)

Selected Major Productions
1982 Wildwechsel (Deer Path) after Kroetz – banned performance
1984 The Love for Three Oranges by Ivan Stanev after Gozzi
1985, 1986 Alchimie de la douleur (The Alchemy of Sorrow) collage by Ivan Stanev after Chekhov, Wittgenstein, Baudelaire, Ionesco – banned performance
1987, 1988 Woyzeck. Die Wunde Woyzeck. Bildbeschreibung (The Wound Woyzeck) after Büchner / Müller, Theatre Sofia, Hebbel Theater Berlin
1989 Betrogen / Gestern an einem sonnigen Nachmittag (Betrayal/Yesterday on a Sunny Afternoon) after Harold Pinter / Heiner Müller, Studiotheater München
1990/91 Schuld und Bühne (Rhyme and Punishment) by Ivan Stanev, Hebbel Theater Berlin, Eurokaz Zagreb
1991 Hermaphroditus by Ivan Stanev, Hebbel Theater Berlin, Kampnagelfabrik Hamburg, Mickery Amsterdam, Theater der Welt Essen
1992 Brüderchen und Schwesterchen (Brother and Sister), by Ivan Stanev, Podewil Berlin
1995 Die Möwe (The Seagull) by Chekhov, Volksbühne Berlin
1998 Sprechen-Schweigen (Speak-Fall Silent) after Ionesco/Wittgenstein, Podewil Berlin
1998 Good night, ladies after Shakespeare/Müller, Künstlerhaus Bethanien Berlin
1999 Histoire de l'œil (Story of the Eye) by Georges Bataille, Théâtre de la Manufacture Nancy, Theatre Sofia
1999 Don Juan im Kumpelnest 3000 zu Berlin (Don Juan in Kumpelnest 3000 in Berlin), Sophiensaele Berlin
2000 Le bleu du ciel (The Blue of Noon)  by Georges Bataille, Sophiensaele Berlin, Théâtre de Chartres, La rose des vents Lille, Théâtre Antoine Vitez Aix-en-Provence
2001 Villa Dei Misteri by Ivan Stanev, Sophiensaele Berlin, Théâtre de la Bastille Paris, Théâtre Antoine Vitez Aix-en-Provence, La rose des vents Lille, FFT Düsseldorf
2002 Luxor Las Vegas by Ivan Stanev, Sophiensaele Berlin
2004 Hollywood Forever by Ivan Stanev, Hebbel Theater Berlin, Le Maillon Strassburg, La rose des vents Lille, FFT Düsseldorf, Gessnerallee Zürich
2004 Moon Lake, after a poem by Ivan Stanev, Norwegian Theatre Academy Fredrikstad
2005 Digging Materials  by Ivan Stanev after Platonov, Theater Sfumato, Sofia
2009, 2010 Mord im Burgtheater (Murder in Burgtheater) by Ivan Stanev, Volksbühne Berlin, Le Maillon Strassburg
2011 Rustschuk - Die gerettete Zunge (Rustschuk - The Saved Tongue) by  Elias Canetti, Theater Osnabrück
2013 Bitte bei TOTLEBEN klingeln - written and directed by Ivan Stanev, Wonderloch Kellerland / Berlin
2015 TTV. Live from Todessa - Totleben TV
2017 Scherzo di Follia - written and directed by Ivan Stanev, Kopfgeldjäger, Berlin
2018 Place Fantôme - written and directed by Ivan Stanev, Hauptstadtkulturfonds, Berlin

Grants and awards
 VILLA DEI MISTERI | Videoart Award | AsoloArtFilmFestival, Italy(2005)
 WEIL | Simone Weil | Work in Progress | GVL, Neustart Kultur (2022)
 LA TÊTE | Jeanne Hébuterne | Work in Progress | GVL, Neustart Kultur (2022)
 KAMIKAZE KARAOKE | Work in Progress | Akademie der Künste, Berlin (2022)
 NINURTA´S EXPLOITS | Poems in Posthuman Akkadian | Work in Progress | Fonds Darstellende Künste (2022)
 MISS TOTO K. | Toto Koopman | Work in Progress | Fonds Darstellende Künste (2022)

References

External links

 Ivan Stanev und der Mord im Burgtheater
 Mord im Burgtheater
 Das Wesen der Erinnerung
 Le rire dionysiaque du monde
 Moon Lake
 Papyri
 Totleben TV
 Chez Totleben
 Bleibende Steinzeit
 The Continental Review
 Ooteoote
 Moving Poems
 Polysèmes

German theatre directors
German mass media people
German-language film directors
1959 births
Living people
Artists from Varna, Bulgaria
Sofia University alumni
Bulgarian emigrants to Germany
German male writers